Lake Klopein is a lake near the town of Völkermarkt located within the municipality of Sankt Kanzian in Carinthia, Austria. Lake Klopein is the remaining lake of previously larger lake area, which has spanned over today's Kühnsdorf area. With water temperatures reaching 29 °C it is among the warmest lakes in the Alpine region.

Geological structure 

Lake Klopein is mostly a still lake. Only a few little streams are flowing into it. The result is a very high water temperature, reaching up to 29 °C . The outgoing stream is on the west side and flows inside the river Drava.
Lake Klopein is 1800 Meters long, 800 Meters wide and has the deepest depth of 48 Meters. Average depth is at 23 Meters.

Because of the rare water influx from the rivers, the Sankt Kanzian municipality is taking great care about preserving the water quality. Since the 1980s when the lake used to be biologically contaminated they managed to add different channels to ventilate the lake. Since 1975 the lake is being filled up through a deep-water installation with additional oxygen. In the 1930s the water circulation reached the depths of 40 Meters, but today the water only circulates until 30 Meters, therefore it requires technical assistance.

A bit smaller Turnersee and also 13 Meters deep lake is known for its high temperatures. It lies about 2 Kilometres further from Lake Klopein and also belongs to municipality of Sankt Kanzian. A popular fishing point is also Kleinsee, which is located on the north of Lake Klopein.

Tourism 

Lake Klopein is a popular tourist destination, therefore hotels and swimming places span around the whole lake area. Most of the swimming areas are private and available only to hotel guests. There are also some public swimming areas, which are equipped with small restaurants.

In the beginning of year 1885 first guests arrived at Lake Klopein, where they offered 40 beds. It was known as a recovery area for lung related illnesses. Until the 1970s the area became more popular as a tourist destination, which has been divided in three areas - Sommerfrischen Klopein (Nordufer), Seelach (Nordwestecke) and Unterburg (Südostecke). Today these three areas are binding together, where the centre of the tourism is in the area of Seelach.

Fish species 
In Lake Klopein 15 different sorts of fish can be found (Statistic review from 2004) :
 Coregonus lavaretus
 Salmo trutta lacustris
 Esox lucius
 Silurus glanis
 Anguilla anguilla
 Leuciscus cephalus
 Ctenopharyngodon idella
 Abramis brama
 Cyprinus carpio
 Alburnus alburnus
 Rutilus rutilus
 Scardinius erythrophthalmus
 Tinca tinca
 Perca fluviatilis
 Sander lucioperca

References

External links 

 Carinthian Institute of Limnology
 Bathing sites at Lake Klopein 
 Klopeiner See - Southern Carinthia tourist site

Klopein